Desired (Spanish: Deseada) is a 1951 Mexican drama film directed by Roberto Gavaldón and starring Dolores del Río, Jorge Mistral and José Baviera.  It contains substantial footage shot in Yucatan, much of it in and around the Maya site of Chichen Itza.

Cast
 Dolores del Río as Deseada  
 Jorge Mistral as Manuel 
 José Baviera as Don Lorenzo  
 Anabelle Gutiérrez as Nicte  
 Arturo Soto Rangel as Don Anselmo  
 Enriqueta Reza as Quiteria  
 Héctor Herrera as El Casamentero  
 Wibeut Puerta as El Pintor  
 Don Chinto as El Chic  
 Rosario Gutiérrez as Rosario  
 E. Puga as El Alfarero  
 Nicolás Urcelay as Invitado

References

Bibliography 
 DeWitt Bodeen. From Hollywood: The Careers of 15 Great American Stars. A. S. Barnes, 1976.

External links 
 

1951 films
1951 drama films
Mexican drama films
1950s Spanish-language films
Films directed by Roberto Gavaldón
Mexican black-and-white films
1950s Mexican films